Auriculoceryx kannegieteri is a moth of the family Erebidae. It was described by Walter Rothschild in 1910. It is found on Nias, an island off the western coast of Sumatra, Indonesia.

References

External links

Syntomini
Moths described in 1910
Moths of Indonesia